The 2014 UCI Cyclo-cross World Championships is the World Championship for cyclo-cross for the season 2013–14. It took place in Hoogerheide, Netherlands on Saturday 1 and Sunday 2 February 2014. Hoogerheide is also the place where the Grand Prix Adri van der Poel is held, up to the 2012–13 season a race in the UCI Cyclo-cross World Cup.

Riders

This world championship saw 229 cyclists taking part, as much as the record that was set in Tábor four years before. Macedonia and Serbia participated for the first time ever, both sending a rider to the Junior Men category. That category saw 59 participants, the Women's Elite had 45 starters. On Sunday 59 Men competed for the Under 23 title and the Elite Men jersey was contended between 66 riders.

Track

The track is, bar some minor changes, identical to the one used for the 2012–13 World Cup. The Junior Men completed five laps, the Elite Women four, the Under-23 six and the Elite Men eight laps.

Schedule

 Saturday 1 February 2014
 11:00 Men's Junior
 15:00 Women's Elite
 Sunday 2 February 2014
 11:00 Men's Under 23
 15:00 Men's Elite

All times in local time (UTC+1).

Medal summary

Medalists

Medal table

References

External links
 

 
Uci Cyclo-cross World Championships, 2014
UCI Cyclo-cross World Championships
International cycle races hosted by the Netherlands
Cycling in North Brabant
Sport in Woensdrecht
February 2014 sports events in Europe